The origins, authenticity, and historicity of the Book of Mormon have been subject to considerable criticism from scholars and skeptics since it was first published in 1830. The Book of Mormon is a sacred text of the Latter Day Saint movement, which adherents believe contains writings of ancient prophets who lived on the American continent from approximately 2200 BC to AD 421. It was first published in March 1830 by Joseph Smith as The Book of Mormon: An Account Written by the Hand of Mormon upon Plates Taken from the Plates of Nephi, who said that it had been written in otherwise unknown characters referred to as "reformed Egyptian" engraved on golden plates that he personally transcribed. Contemporary followers of the Latter Day Saint movement typically regard the text primarily as scripture, but also as a historical record of God's dealings with the ancient inhabitants of the Americas.

Mainstream scholarship does not conclude the Book of Mormon is of an ancient origin and consider the book a creation by Smith and possibly one or more others, drawing on material and ideas from the contemporary 19th-century environment rather than translating an ancient record. They argue that no evidence of a reformed Egyptian language has ever been discovered. The content found within the book has also been questioned. Scholars have pointed out a number of anachronisms within the text, and general archaeological or genetic evidence has not supported the book's statements about the indigenous peoples of the Americas. The text has also undergone many revisions with some significant changes, which critics argue have notably altered its meaning, and see as a rebuttal of its divine origins.

Despite the many scholarly challenges to its authenticity, adherents and many Latter Day Saint scholars have repeatedly defended the book. The oldest, and most significant, defense of Smith's account of its origins comes from the testimonies of the Three Witnesses and the Eight Witnesses, which are published in every copy of the book. More contemporary adherents have also sought to rebut critical viewpoints. For instance, identification of reformed Egyptian with a known ancient Egyptian dialect has been proposed. A few Latter Day Saint scholars have also proposed archaeological findings give credence to the book, although mainstream scholars disagree.

Ancient origin

Some scholars reject Joseph Smith's explanation of the origin of the Book of Mormon. Smith said that the text contained within the Book of Mormon was derived from an ancient Native American record written on golden plates, and that God gave him and a few others the power to translate it into English. Critics note that there has never been any physical proof of the existence of the golden plates; Smith said that the angel Moroni, who appeared to him and instructed him on how to recover the plates from where they were buried, reclaimed the plates once Smith had completed the translation. To provide support towards the existence of the plates, Smith included two statements in the Book of Mormon saying that several witnesses had been shown the plates, and their testimony is typically published at the beginning of the Book of Mormon. While none of these men ever retracted their statements, critics nevertheless discount these testimonies for varying reasons, one of which is because most of these men were closely interrelated.  In later years Martin Harris, one of the witnesses, is recorded to have confessed that he saw the plates with a "spiritual eye" or "eye of faith".

Most linguists, archaeologists, and historians do not regard the Book of Mormon to be of ancient origin. In 1834, a publication by Eber D. Howe claimed that Smith had plagiarized an unpublished manuscript written by Solomon Spalding. Scholars today have varying theories about the true authorship of the Book of Mormon, but most conclude that Smith composed the book himself, possibly with the help of Oliver Cowdery and Sidney Rigdon, drawing from information and publications available in his time, including the King James Bible,  The Wonders of Nature, and View of the Hebrews.

Existence of golden plates
Two separate sets of witnesses, a set of three and a set of eight, testified as having seen the golden plates, the record from which the Book of Mormon was translated. Additionally, each of the Three Witnesses (Martin Harris, Oliver Cowdery, and David Whitmer) left the church during Joseph Smith's lifetime and considered Smith to have been a fallen prophet.  Harris and Cowdery later returned to the church. Josiah Stowell, not one of the original sets of witnesses, under oath of the court, indicated that he saw a portion of the plate stack.

Apologists note that the witnesses in most cases affirmed their testimonies until their death. In 1881, Whitmer, the one witness who never returned to the church, issued an affidavit reaffirming his testimony of the experience.

Text and language

Joseph Smith said he translated the Book of Mormon from a language called reformed Egyptian. Archaeologists and Egyptologists have found no evidence that this language ever existed. Hugh Nibley, a Mormon apologist, argues that reformed Egyptian is actually Meroitic Egyptian.

Furthermore, official LDS Church commentary on the Book of Mormon says that at least some ancestors of Native Americans came from the Jerusalem area; however, Native American linguistic specialists have not found any Native American language that appears to be related to languages of the ancient Near East.

Supporters point out the interesting elements of the creation drama that turn up in temple, tomb, or coffin texts from ancient Egypt that is described in detail in the Book of Mormon as the coronation of King Mosiah long before these ancient texts were understood by Egyptologists.

Supporters of the Book of Mormon say it uses chiasmus—a figure of speech utilizing inverted parallelism—and point to it as evidence supporting the book's ancient origin. Critics such as Jerald and Sandra Tanner argue that chiasmus in the Book of Mormon is a characteristic of Joseph Smith's speech pattern and not evidence of antiquity.  They cite the use of chiasmus in the Doctrine and Covenants, which was not translated from an ancient text, as evidence.

Smith was known as a treasure-hunter long before he said he found the golden plates. Grant H. Palmer suggested that Smith borrowed the name "Cumorah" through his study of the treasure-hunting stories of Captain William Kidd, based on the similarity of the names from Smith's account—Moroni and Cumorah—to the location Moroni, Comoros, related to Kidd's hunt for treasure.

Translation
 

The only statement Joseph Smith ever made about the translation process was "through the medium of the urim and thummim I translated the record, by the gift and power of God." Martin Harris, Smith's second scribe, and David Whitmer, who witnessed Smith dictating the translation of the plates to Oliver Cowdery, both describe the process as an exact word-for-word translation.

Modern LDS scholars tend to fall into two schools regarding the nature of the translation process: tight control and loose control. Those who believe in the tight control interpretation argue that Smith had very little leeway in the words used in dictating the Book of Mormon, but was not restricted to an exact word-for-word translation. Those who believe in the loose control interpretation argue that ideas were revealed to Joseph Smith' and he put them 'into his own language.

Biblical language
The Book of Mormon claims to be the original writings of Nephite leaders in ancient America, yet it contains  paraphrased quotations of the 17th-century edition of the King James Bible (KJV) and the deuterocanonical books, which Joseph Smith's bible had as well. Furthermore, the language of the Book of Mormon closely mimics the Elizabethan English used in the KJV, with 19th-century English mixed into it.

The Book of Mormon quotes 25,000 words from the KJV Old Testament and over 2,000 words from the KJV New Testament.

There are numerous cases where the Nephite writers mimic wording from the New Testament, a document to which they would have had no access. Below are five examples out of a list of 400 examples created by Jerald and Sandra Tanner:

Here are some parallels with the Deuterocanonical Books and the Book of Mormon.  In particular, 2 Maccabees includes the name "Nephi". Examples of purported parallels include:

Names

Critics believe Joseph Smith came up with all the names in the Book of Mormon, noting that Joseph owned a King James Bible with a table listing all the names used in the Bible. Many Book of Mormon names are either biblical, formed from a rhyming pattern, changed by a prefix or suffix, Hebrew, Egyptian, Sumerian, or Greek in etymology. Furthermore, Jaredites and Nephites shared names despite the Jaredites being of a different place and language than the Nephites, although the Nephites incorporated the people of Zarahemla into their polity, which had co-existed in time and place with the Jaredites.

Views toward women
The Book of Mormon has been criticized for its lack of significant female characters in the narrative. In the Old Testament, male pronouns "he" and "his" are mentioned 6.5 times more than female pronouns "she" and "her", but in the Book of Mormon, the ratio is 31 times more often, and in the small plates of Nephi, it is 46 times more often. Only six female characters are explicitly named in the Book of Mormon (Sariah the wife of Lehi, Abish a Lamanitish woman, Isabel the harlot, Eve, Sarah, and Mary), compared to 188 in the Bible. No woman, except perhaps the wife of King Lamoni, in the Book of Mormon is portrayed as having her own independent connection with heaven.

Historical accuracy

Most, but not all, Mormons hold the book's connection to ancient American history as an article of their faith. According to Professor John-Charles Duffy this view finds little acceptance outside of Mormonism because "scholars realize that accepting the Book of Mormon’s antiquity also means coming to terms with LDS beliefs about Joseph Smith’s access to supernatural powers." The theory that the Book of Mormon is an ancient American history is thus considered to fall outside academic credibility. Mormon apologetics have proposed multiple theories tying Book of Mormon places to modern locations.

Anachronisms

There are a number of words and phrases in the Book of Mormon that are anachronistic—their existence in the text of the Book of Mormon is at odds with known linguistic patterns, archaeological findings, or known historical events.

Each of the anachronisms is a word, phrase, artifact, or other concept that critics, historians, archaeologists, or linguists believe did not exist in the Americas during the time period in which the Book of Mormon was said to have been written.

Apologists offer varying responses and views at Anachronisms in the Book of Mormon.

Archaeology

Since the publication of the Book of Mormon in 1830, both Mormon and non-Mormon archaeologists have attempted to find archaeological evidence to support or criticize it. Members of the Church of Jesus Christ of Latter-day Saints (LDS Church) and other denominations of the Latter Day Saint movement generally believe that the Book of Mormon describes ancient historical events in the Americas, but mainstream historians and archaeologists do not regard it as a work of ancient American history.

Some early 20th century researchers presented various archaeological findings such as place names, and ruins of the Inca, Maya, Olmec, and other ancient American and Old World civilizations as giving credence to the Book of Mormon record. Others disagree with these conclusions, arguing that the Book of Mormon mentions several animals, plants, and technologies that are not substantiated by the archaeological record between 3100 BC to 400 AD in America.

Native American genetics

Since the late 1990s pioneering work of Luigi Luca Cavalli-Sforza and others, scientists have developed techniques that attempt to use genetic markers to indicate the ethnic background and history of individual people. The data developed by these mainstream scientists tell us that the Native Americans have very distinctive DNA markers, and that some of them are most similar, among old world populations, to the DNA of people anciently associated with the Altay Mountains area of central Asia. This conclusion from a genetic perspective supports a large amount of archaeological, anthropological, and linguistic evidence that Native American peoples' ancestors migrated from Asia at the latest 16,500–13,000 years ago. (See Settlement of the Americas and Genetic history of indigenous peoples of the Americas).

The mainstream scientific consensus about the origin of the ancient Americans and peoples is apparently at odds with the claims put forth in the Book of Mormon, although Mormon apologists have made efforts to reconcile these apparent contradictions.

The Church of Jesus Christ of Latter-Day Saints released an essay on their website titled "Book of Mormon and DNA Studies". The conclusion states, "Much as critics and defenders of the Book of Mormon would like to use DNA studies to support their views, the evidence is simply inconclusive."

Population size and the Book of Mormon
Critics challenge the viability of the population size and growth of the Book of Mormon people using the parameter that there was no incorporation of existing populations.  M. T. Lamb may have been the very first critic to suggest that the Book of Mormon has an unrealistic population growth rate.  Modern studies on population size and growth have been done by John Kunich and FARMS writer James Smith.  Kunich's analysis agrees with Lamb's that the Book of Mormon presents an unrealistic growth rate for the population, but Smith disagrees, and says that the growth rate is realistic.

Textual revisions

Critics also challenge the divine origin of the Book of Mormon by noting the numerous revisions that have been made to the text. Though most changes are small spelling and grammar corrections, critics claim that even these are significant in light of Smith's claims of divine inspiration. Smith claimed that the Book of Mormon was "the most correct of any book on earth," and Martin Harris said that the words which appeared on the seer stone would not disappear until they were correctly written; Critics assert that some of these changes were systematic attempts to hide the book's flaws.

Relation to the Book of Abraham

Critics point out that Joseph Smith also translated the Book of Abraham. Unlike the Book of Mormon, fragments of the documents from which Smith translated the Book of Abraham are available for inspection; Egyptologists find no resemblance between the original text and Smith's translation.

Supporters point out that the Church has never claimed that the fragments of papyri which include facsimile 1, 2, and 3 are where Joseph Smith obtained his material for the Book of Abraham.  These fragments are from the Egyptian Book of the Dead which was just one of the scrolls from Egypt that Joseph Smith had in his possession. When these fragments were discovered in the Metropolitan Museum many years ago, Hugh Nibley wrote a book called The Message of the Joseph Smith Papyri, An Ancient Egyptian Endowment showing how the fragments that had been discovered had nothing to do with the Book of Abraham but everything to do with Egyptian funeral texts from the Book of the Dead.

The translation of the papyri by both Mormon and non-Mormon Egyptologists does not match the text of the Book of Abraham as purportedly translated by Joseph Smith. Indeed, the transliterated text from the recovered papyri and facsimiles published in the Book of Abraham contain no direct references, either historical or textual, to Abraham, and Abraham's name does not appear anywhere in the papyri or the facsimiles. Edward Ashment notes, "The sign that Smith identified with Abraham ... is nothing more than the hieratic version of ... a 'w' in Egyptian. It has no phonetic or semantic relationship to [Smith's] 'Ah-broam. University of Chicago Egyptologist Robert K. Ritner concluded in 2014 that the source of the Book of Abraham "is the 'Breathing Permit of Hôr,' misunderstood and mistranslated by Joseph Smith", and that the other papyri are common Egyptian funerary documents like the Book of the Dead.

Original manuscripts of the Book of Abraham, microfilmed in 1966 by Jerald Tanner, show portions of the Joseph Smith Papyri and their purported translations into the Book of Abraham. Ritner concludes, contrary to the LDS position, due to the microfilms being published prior to the rediscovery of the Joseph Smith Papyri, that "it is not true that 'no eyewitness account of the translation survives, that the Book of Abraham is "confirmed as a perhaps well-meaning, but erroneous invention by Joseph Smith", and "despite its inauthenticity as a genuine historical narrative, the Book of Abraham remains a valuable witness to early American religious history and to the recourse to ancient texts as sources of modern religious faith and speculation".

See also
 Criticism of Mormon sacred texts
 Criticism of the Church of Jesus Christ of Latter-day Saints

Notes

References
 

 .

 .

 .
 
 . Note that this work is a condensed revision of Mormonism: Shadow or Reality?.
 .
 .

 .

Further reading

 
 
 

Book of Mormon
Criticism of Mormonism
Pre-Columbian trans-oceanic contact